Bill 'Newhaven' Jackson (13 April 1874 – 11 September 1921) was an Australian cyclist and an Australian rules footballer who played for Essendon and St Kilda in the Victorian Football League (VFL).

Football
Jackson, who was nicknamed after a Melbourne Cup winning horse, came to Essendon from Ballarat Imperials. He played as a follower in the 1898 VFL Grand Final loss to Fitzroy but was also used as a forward during his career. Jackson injured his knee early in Essendon's 1900 semi final encounter with Melbourne and retired. He returned in the 1903 season as captain of St Kilda.

At the end of the 1899 season, in the process of naming his own "champion player", the football correspondent for The Argus ("Old Boy"), selected a team of the best players of the 1899 VFL competition:Backs: Maurie Collins (Essendon), Bill Proudfoot (Collingwood), Peter Burns (Geelong); Halfbacks: Pat Hickey (Fitzroy), George Davidson (South Melbourne), Alf Wood (Melbourne); Centres: Fred Leach (Collingwood), Firth McCallum (Geelong), Harry Wright (Essendon); Wings: Charlie Pannam (Collingwood), Eddie Drohan (Fitzroy), Herb Howson (South Melbourne); Forwards: Bill Jackson (Essendon), Eddy James (Geelong), Charlie Colgan (South Melbourne); Ruck: Mick Pleass (South Melbourne), Frank Hailwood (Collingwood), Joe McShane (Geelong); Rovers: Dick Condon (Collingwood), Bill McSpeerin (Fitzroy), Teddy Rankin (Geelong).From those he considered to be the three best players — that is, Condon, Hickey, and Pleass — he selected Pat Hickey as his "champion player" of the season. ('Old Boy', "Football: A Review of the Season", (Monday, 18 September 1899), p.6).

Cycling
Also a successful cyclist, Jackson won Melbourne to Warrnambool Classic in 1897 and two Australian Cycling Championships.

See also
 The Footballers' Alphabet

Notes

References
 'Follower', "The Footballers' Alphabet", The Leader, (Saturday, 23 July 1898), p.17.
 Holmesby, Russell & Main, Jim (2014). The Encyclopedia of AFL Footballers: every AFL/VFL player since 1897 (10th ed.). Melbourne, Victoria: Bas Publishing. .

External links

1874 births
1921 deaths
Essendon Football Club players
St Kilda Football Club players
Ballarat Imperial Football Club players
Australian rules footballers from Victoria (Australia)
Australian male cyclists
People from Stawell, Victoria